The men's K-1 200 metres sprint canoeing event at the 2020 Summer Olympics took place on 4 and 5 August 2021 at the Sea Forest Waterway. At least 12 canoeists from at least 12 nations competed.

Background
This was the 3rd appearance of the event, which replaced the men's K-1 500 metres in 2012.

The 2016 Olympic champion and reigning World Champion is Liam Heath of Great Britain, who earned a place for his NOC and has been selected to compete.

Qualification

A National Olympic Committee (NOC) only qualify 1 boat in the event, but could enter up to 2 boats if it had enough men's kayak quota place through other events. A total of 12 qualification places were available, initially allocated as follows:

 5 places awarded through the 2019 ICF Canoe Sprint World Championships
 6 places awarded through continental tournaments, 1 per continent except 2 places for Europe
 1 place awarded through the 2021 Canoe Sprint World Cup Stage 2.

Qualifying places were awarded to the NOC, not to the individual canoeist who earned the place.

Spain had to decline a quota place due to exceeding the total limit of 6 men's kayak places per nation (after qualifying in the K-4 and K-2 as well). This made a total of 5 World Championship places that were awarded as follows:

The Americas continental tournament was cancelled; that place was allocated through the World Championships, with the place going to Argentina. Egypt earned Africa's place (after South Africa declined), South Korea took Asia's, ROC and Latvia earned Europe's two places, and Samoa took Oceania's. Lithuania earned the final spot at the World Cup.

Nations with men's kayak quota spots from the K-1 1000 metres, K-2 100 metres, or K-4 metres could enter (additional) boats as well.

Competition format
Sprint canoeing uses a four-round format for events with at least 11 boats, with heats, quarterfinals, semifinals, and finals. The details for each round depend on how many boats ultimately enter.

The course is a flatwater course 9 metres wide. The name of the event describes the particular format within sprint canoeing. The "K" format means a kayak, with the canoeist sitting, using a double-bladed paddle to paddle, and steering with a foot-operated rudder (as opposed to a canoe, with a kneeling canoeist, single-bladed paddle, and no rudder). The "1" is the number of canoeists in each boat. The "200 metres" is the distance of each race.

Schedule
The event was held over two consecutive days, with two rounds per day. All sessions started at 9:30 a.m. local time, though there are multiple events with races in each session.

Results

Heats
Progression System: 1st-2nd to SF, rest to QF.

Heat 1

Heat 2

Heat 3

Heat 4

Heat 5

Quarterfinals 
Progression System: 1st-2nd to SF, rest out.

Quarterfinal 1

Quarterfinal 2

Quarterfinal 3

Semifinals
Progression System: 1st-4th to Final A, rest to Final B.

Semifinal 1

Semifinal 2

Finals

Final A

Final B

References

Men's K-1 200 metres
Men's events at the 2020 Summer Olympics